Nuchequula is a genus of ponyfishes native to the Indian Ocean and the western Pacific Ocean.

Species
There are currently seven recognized species in this genus:
 Nuchequula blochii (Valenciennes, 1835) (Twoblotch ponyfish)
 Nuchequula flavaxilla Seishi Kimura, R. Kimura & Ikejima, 2008 (Yellowspotted ponyfish)
 Nuchequula gerreoides (Bleeker, 1851) (Decorated ponyfish)
 Nuchequula glenysae Seishi Kimura, R. Kimura & Ikejima, 2008
 Nuchequula longicornis Seishi Kimura, R. Kimura & Ikejima, 2008
 Nuchequula mannusella Chakrabarty & Sparks, 2007
 Nuchequula nuchalis (Temminck & Schlegel, 1845) (Spotnape ponyfish)

References

Leiognathidae
Taxa named by Gilbert Percy Whitley